Ramprasad Rai is a rural municipality out of seven rural municipalities of Bhojpur District of Province No. 1 of Nepal. There are a total of nine municipalities in Bhojpur District in which two are urban and seven are rural.

The municipality is situated in south-west area of the district. The municipality got its name after Ram Prasad Rai who was a democratic warrior.

The municipality is divided into eight wards.

Okhre, Dhodalekhani, Bhulke, Dalgaun, Manebhanjyang, Baikunthe and Basikhola were Incorporated when this new local level body was forming. This new local level body was formed on 10 March 2017, fulfilling the requirement of the new Constitution of Nepal 2015, Ministry of Federal Affairs and Local Development replaced all old VDCs and Municipalities into 753 new local level body (Municipality).

References

Rural municipalities in Koshi Province
Populated places in Bhojpur District, Nepal
Rural municipalities of Nepal established in 2017
Rural municipalities in Bhojpur District